Vitaliy Holubyev (19 March 1926 – 25 March 1991) was an association footballer from the former Soviet Union who played for FC Dynamo Kyiv.

In 1956 Holubyev played couple of games for Ukraine at the Spartakiad of the Peoples of the USSR.

References

1926 births
1991 deaths
Footballers from Moscow
Soviet footballers
Ukrainian footballers
Soviet Top League players
FC Dynamo Luhansk players
FC CSKA Kyiv players
FC Dynamo Kyiv players
FC Podillya Khmelnytskyi players
FC Nyva Vinnytsia players
FC Frunzenets-Liha-99 Sumy players
Merited Coaches of Ukraine
Association football defenders